Liss, Lyss or LISS may refer to

Liss (band), a Danish musical group
Liss (name), a given name and surname
Liss, Hampshire, a village in England
West Liss, the oldest part of Liss village
Liss Forest, a hamlet near Liss 
Liss Athletic F.C., a semi-professional football club based in Liss 
Liss railway station, on the Portsmouth Direct Line
Liss Forest Road railway station, a former station on the Longmoor Military Railway
LISS panel (Longitudinal Internet Studies for the Social sciences), Netherlands
Lyss, a municipality in Switzerland

See also
Lis (disambiguation)
Lys (disambiguation)
M'Liss (disambiguation)